George Murray Smith DL JP (4 February 1859 – 18 April 1919) was a chairman of the Midland Railway from 1911 until his death.

He was the son of George Murray Smith, the publisher.  He was educated at Harrow School; and Jesus College, Cambridge.  In 1885 he married Ellen Strutt, youngest daughter of Edward Strutt, 1st Baron Belper.  They had three sons, two of whom were killed during World War I, and a daughter. He was appointed as a deputy lieutenant of Leicestershire in April 1903.

References 

 ‘SMITH, George Murray’,   Who Was Who,  A & C Black,   1920–2008;     online edn,   Oxford University Press, Dec 2007       accessed 20 Jan 2012
 Anita McConnell, ‘Smith,  George Murray  (1859–1919)’, Oxford Dictionary of National Biography, Oxford University Press,  2004 accessed                                                                         George Murray Smith (1859–1919): 

Deputy Lieutenants of Leicestershire
1859 births
1919 deaths
People educated at Harrow School
Alumni of Jesus College, Cambridge